The Mine with the Iron Door may refer to:

 The Mine with the Iron Door, 1923 novel by Harold Bell Wright
 The Mine with the Iron Door (1924 film), silent film based on the novel
 The Mine with the Iron Door (1936 film), remake of the film